Ozoir-la-Ferrière is a commune in the Seine-et-Marne department in the Île-de-France region in north-central France.

Demographics
Inhabitants are called Ozoiriens or Ozophoriciens.

History
During the French Revolution, Ozoir-la-Ferrière was temporarily renamed Ozoir-la-Raison, meaning "Ozoir the Reason".

Transportation
Ozoir-la-Ferrière is served by Ozoir-la-Ferrière station on Paris RER line .

Twin cities
Ozoir-la-Ferrière is twinned with the town of Swords, the county town of Fingal, in Dublin, eastern Ireland.

See also
Communes of the Seine-et-Marne department

References

External links

Official website 
1999 Land Use, from IAURIF (Institute for Urban Planning and Development of the Paris-Île-de-France région) 

Communes of Seine-et-Marne